Tenguella granulata, common name the mulberry shell or the granulated drupe, is a species of sea snail, a marine gastropod mollusk in the family Muricidae, the murex snails or rock snails.

Description
The shell size varies between 18 mm and 30 mm. The conical, oblong shell is compact and contains no varices. It is covered with dark brown to black blunt knobs on a white background with spiral cords between the rows. The body whorl is covered with six rows of nodules. The outer lip is dentate with four to five teeth within. The narrow aperture is blackish. The columella and the inner lip are white.

This globular shape, tight shell coiling, strong sculpture, a dentate outer lip and narrow aperture offers an added protection against shell-crushing predators, such as fishes and crabs.

This mollusc is a predator and feeds by drilling sedentary or semi-mobile prey. It eats only other molluscs, mainly  gastropods of the genera Cerithium, Rissoina, Heliacus, and Bittium, and the mussel Hormomya.

Imposex in Morula granulata is a bioindicator for the presence of tributyltin (TBT) contamination (an anti-fouling paint for boats which affects females of the species).

Distribution
This species is can be found on a rocky substrate or reef flats  in the intertidal zone. It is distributed in the Red Sea, in the Indian Ocean off Aldabra Atoll, Chagos, East Coast of South Africa, Transkei, Natal, Kenya, Madagascar,  the Mascarene Basin, Mozambique and Tanzania, and in the Indo-West Pacific; also off Australia (Northern Territory, Queensland, Western Australia).

Fossils have been found in Quaternary strata of the Seychelles and Vanuatu, age range: 0.126 to 0.012 Ma

References

 Duclos, M. 1832. Description de quelques espèces de Pourpres, servant de type a six sections establies dans ce Genre. Annales des Sciences Naturelles, Paris 26: 103-113
 Blainville, H.M.D. de 1832. Dispostion méthodique des espèces récentes et fossiles des genres Pourpre, Ricinule. Nouvelles Annales du Muséum d'Histoire Naturelle. Paris 1: 189-263 
 Sowerby, G.B. (3rd) 1908. Descriptions of eight new species of marine mollusca. Proceedings of the Malacological Society of London 8: 16-19, pl. 11
 Dautzenberg, Ph. (1929). Mollusques testaces marins de Madagascar. Faune des Colonies Francaises, Tome III
 Kalk, M. (1958). The fauna of the intertidal rocks at Inhaca Island, Delagoa Bay. Ann. Natal Mus. 14: 189-242
 W. & M. Kalk (eds) (1958). A natural history of Inhaca Island, Mozambique. Witwatersrand Univ. Press, Johannesburg. I-iv, 163 pp.
 Kilburn, R.N. & Rippey, E. (1982) Sea Shells of Southern Africa. Macmillan South Africa, Johannesburg, xi + 249 pp. page(s): 87
 Drivas, J. & M. Jay (1988). Coquillages de La Réunion et de l'île Maurice
 Wilson, B. 1994. Australian Marine Shells. Prosobranch Gastropods. Kallaroo, WA : Odyssey Publishing Vol. 2 370 pp.
 Tan, K.S. 1995. Taxonomy of Thais and Morula (Mollusca: Gastropoda: Muricidae) in Singapore and Vicinity. 546 pp. 
 P. Jensen. 1996. Common Seashells of Coastal Northern Queensland
 Middelfart, P. 1997. An illustrated checklist of Muricidae (Gastropoda: Prosobranchia) from the Andaman Sea, Thailand. Phuket Marine Biological Center Special Publication 17(2): 349-388
 Branch, G.M. et al. (2002). Two Oceans. 5th impression. David Philip, Cate Town & Johannesburg

External links
 
 Purpura tuberculata Blainville, 1832: photographs of specimens (including syntypes) from Muséum National d'Histoire Naturelle; original illustration and description from the museum's annals.
 Purpura granulata Duclos, 1832: description in French and colour illustration.

granulata
Gastropods described in 1832